"We Can't Go On Living Like This" is a song co-written and recorded by American country music artist Eddie Rabbitt.  It was released in August 1977 as the second single from the album Rabbitt.  The song reached number six on the Billboard Hot Country Singles & Tracks chart.  It was written by Rabbitt and Even Stevens.

Chart performance

References

1977 singles
Eddie Rabbitt songs
Songs written by Eddie Rabbitt
Songs written by Even Stevens (songwriter)
Song recordings produced by David Malloy
Elektra Records singles
1977 songs